The Tokai Stakes (Japanese 東海ステークス) is a Grade 2 horse race for Thoroughbreds aged four and over run in January over a distance of 1800 metres at Chukyo Racecourse.

It was first run in 1984 as the Grade 3 Winter Stakes and was promoted to Grade 2 in 1999. It was renamed the Tokai Stakes in 2000. The race was initially run over 2200 metres but switched to 2300 metres in 1986. The distance was reduced to 1900 metres in 2010 and 1800 metres in 2013. The race often serves as a trial for the February Stakes.

Winners since 2000 

 The 2010, 2011 and 2012 races took place at Kyoto Racecourse.
 Vanyar crossed the finish line first but was disqualified because the jockey fell off.

Earlier winners

 1984 - Andre Amon
 1985 - Cherry Foot
 1986 - Life Tateyama
 1987 - Crowd Exceed
 1988 - Soda Kazan
 1989 - Marubutsu Superior
 1990 - Narita Hayabusa
 1991 - Narita Hayabusa
 1992 - Cherry Koman
 1993 - Laurier Andre
 1994 - Lively Mount
 1995 - Kyoto City
 1996 - Toyo Seattle
 1997 - Abukuma Poro
 1998 - Machikanewaraukado
 1999 - My Turn

See also
 Horse racing in Japan
 List of Japanese flat horse races

References

Horse races in Japan